Zemlianky is a village in Chuhuiv Raion, Kharkiv Oblast (province) of Ukraine.

Until 18 July 2020, Zemlianky was located in Vovchansk Raion. The raion was abolished on that day as part of the administrative reform of Ukraine, which reduced the number of raions of Kharkiv Oblast to seven.

References

Villages in Chuhuiv Raion